Parviz Karimi (born March 21, 1986) is an Iranian footballer who plays as a goalkeeper for Gostaresh Foulad in the Persian Gulf Pro League.

Club career

Shahid Ghandi
He spent five years in Yazd and left Shahid Ghandi Yazd after relegation to Division 1.

Shahrdari Bandar Abbas
As summer 2006 he joined newly established club, Shahrdari Bandar Abbas. In his seventh season in club he turned to first choice and made 23 appearances.

Esteghlal Khuzestan
After a great season with Shahrdari Bandar Abbas he joined Ahvazi side, Esteghlal Khuzestan with a two-year contract. After poor reveals from Fábio Carvalho he was chosen as first goalkeeper by Abdollah Veisi and made his debut for Esteghlal Khuzestan in the Ahvaz Derby against Foolad during the 2013–14 Iran Pro League.

After spells at Esteghlal Ahvaz, Aluminium Arak, Gol Gohar and Machine Sazi, Karimi joined Gostaresh Foulad in July 2018.

Club career statistics

References

External links
 Parviz Karimi at PersianLeague.com
 Parviz Karimi at IranLeague.ir

1986 births
Living people
People from Hormozgan Province
Iranian footballers
Tarbiat Yazd players
Shahrdari Bandar Abbas players
Esteghlal Khuzestan players
Esteghlal Ahvaz players
Aluminium Arak players
Gol Gohar players
Machine Sazi F.C. players
Gostaresh Foulad F.C. players
Persian Gulf Pro League players
Azadegan League players
Association football goalkeepers